Alix Wilkinson (born August 2, 2000) is an American World Cup alpine skier from Mammoth Lakes, California. She focuses on the speed events of downhill and super-G, and made her World Cup debut in December 2019 in downhill at Lake Louise, Canada.

Wilkinson represented the United States at the 2022 Winter Olympics as a replacement for an injured Breezy Johnson.

World Cup results

Season standings

Olympic results

References

External links 

 
 
 Alix Wilkinson at U.S. Ski Team

2000 births
Living people
American female alpine skiers
21st-century American women
Alpine skiers at the 2022 Winter Olympics
Olympic alpine skiers of the United States
People from Mammoth Lakes, California
Sportspeople from California